Fablefactory is a band from Athens, GA.

The band was officially formed on May Day 1996, consisting of Davey Wrathgabar (The Visitations, Elf Power), Hank Wren (Ned Kelly, Gamut, and, FM51), and Freckles Le Chat (Dixie Blood Mustache) with Dallas Longhorne joining the band prior to recording their first album. Their debut single, Fowell Byrd, was released in October 1997 and received a warm review in Magnet Magazine. Then, they released their first album American Custard in 1999.  It was lauded by both Flagpole Magazine (Athens, GA) and Penny Black Music (U.K.) as one of the top albums of 1999. In 2000, AC was released in Japan with the addition of the Fowell Byrd single.  The band toured and played in '99/'00 with Of Montreal, Elf Power, The Minders, Olivia Tremor Control, Drums & Tuba, Radio 4, The Impossible Shapes, etc.

The band self-released a second single, Chocolate Rainbow b/w They Come From Planet Goo! in 2000.  In 2001, the band began compiling an assortment of outtakes, demos, the 2 singles, and oddities for a release in the run up to their "new album" plans.  That compilation would eventually become We Won't Rock You!!! (2002), the second album.  During the final two weeks of June, 2001 Fablefactory would record their most accomplished, professional, and least heard album, Freak Out Hard On You.  A brief two-legged dog version of the band did reconvene for a week of shows in Seattle, El Paso, Austin, Denton, New Orleans, and Athens in the spring of 2003.  Currently, the band is planning a self-released boxset of "greatest hits", live, demo, outtake, cover, and "genesis" recordings titled, Go Home Fablefactory!:  A Parallax Spew.  Release date:  10/10/10. 

Wrathgabar also records under the moniker The Visitations, which released a self-titled album on Happy Happy Birthday To Me Records in 2001, self-released a follow-up, Propaganda in 2004, and The Conundrum Tree through Orange Twin Records in 2008.

Discography

Albums
 American Custard (CD) - Red Carpet Ring/Vivid Sound Corporation - 1999/2000 
 We Won't Rock You (CD) - [Happy Happy Birthday To Me Records|HHBTM] - 2002
 Freak Out Hard On You (CD/CD limited package/LP) - HHBTM - 2002

Singles and EPs
 Fowell Byrd (7") - Uncomfortable Chair Co. - 1997 
 Trot Not On The Poop Deck (cass.) (split w/Mr Whiggs ) - 1999 
 Chocolate Rainbow b/w They Come From the Planet Goo (7") - UCC - 2000

Compilations
 Live in the Lobby WUOG 90.5FM Athens, GA
 Hydrponic Mascara Vol. 2 - a various artist compilation
 Happy Happy Birthday to Me Vol. 2
 The Winter Report:  a hype city compilation

Rock music groups from Georgia (U.S. state)
The Elephant 6 Recording Company artists